Yakkity Yak is a Flash animated television series produced by the Vancouver-based animation studio Studio B Productions and Kapow Pictures. It was created by Mark Gravas and aired on Teletoon in Canada and on Nickelodeon in Australia from 9 November 2002 to 12 December 2003. 26 episodes were produced.

The copyright to the show is owned by DHX Media (now known as WildBrain), which bought Studio B Productions in 2007.

Premise 
The story centres around an anthropomorphic yak named Yakkity who aspires to become a famous comedian and his friends, Keo (an anthropomorphic pineapple) and Lemony (a young human girl) in Onion Falls (based on Lithgow, New South Wales).

Theme song
A modified version of the 1958 song Yakety Yak by The Coasters (in which children and some cast members sing some portions) is used as the series' theme song.

Characters
Yakkity Yak (Lee Tockar): A yak student (aged 12) in Onion Falls Junior High School and the school's mascot who wishes to be a comedian. Yakkity works as the school mascot since his grandfather also served as mascot when the (rugby) football team won the state championship in 1925. The football team, instead of the mascot, got all the glory (despite having not won a match since 1925), much to Yakkity's distaste. Yakkity now lives with his Granny and her boarder Professor Crazyhair. He wears a coat over his bare body. His closest friends are Keo (who lives next door) and Lemony. Over the course of the series, his parents have never been seen or mentioned.
Keo (Brian Drummond): An anthropomorphic pineapple who is actually a human with a pineapple for a head. He is very intelligent but is camera shy and has stage fright. He has rivalries with his father who is only a pineapple, but deep down, he loves him.
Lemony (Andrea Libman): A blond-haired human girl and Keo's love interest who has a vivid imagination.
Reginald Highpants (Ian James Corlett): The town's leading vendor of candy and all things with sugar. He also runs many small businesses.
Trilo (Jason Schombing): Yakkity's trilobite agent and former circus performer who owns his own Entertainment Agency, does children's parties for the characters, and is always looking for money. His clients are Yakkity, Fairy Wanda and Chuck Damage, who he uses for parties.
Granny Yak (Pam Hyatt): Yak's grandmother. While she is a good sounding board in a parental way, she also has some of Yakkity's impulsive genes.
Professor Crazyhair (Scott McNeil): A scientist and teacher at Onion Falls High whose hair changes colour like a mood ring, hence his name. He lives in Yakkity's basement, where he built a laboratory. His egg salad recipe is very sought after by evil geniuses who wish to use it to take over the world.
Penelope (Tabitha St. Germain): A robot who is Lemony's best friend and works as Professor Crazyhair's assistant but lacks any social skills or confidence. Whenever she's embarrassed, her face turns red and she squirts out fire fighting foams from her arms transforming into fire hoses, squirting everything around her.
Rondo (Ian James Corlett): Lemony's (rugby) football playing brother who is a senior in junior high. He is one of Yakkity's main antagonists often competing for the spotlight.
Keo's Dad (Michael Daingerfield): A pineapple who can be bossy and rude at many times, and Keo's father. The identity of his wife (Keo's birth mother) is unknown and never explored; it can be assumed that she either died or got divorced before the events of Yakkity Yak. He's only a disembodied pineapple head; as the only time he ever had a body with limbs was in "My Dad the Robot".
Wanda Harper (Brenda Crichlow): a fairy who works as Onion Falls High's librarian.
Jackie Pachyderm: An elephant comedian and successful movie star who is Yakkity's idol.

Broadcast
Yakkity Yak debuted on Teletoon in Canada on 4 January 2003, with the last episode airing on 28 January 2004. It also aired on BBC Kids. In the UK it aired on CBBC. In Australia, it aired on Nickelodeon and Network 10, and would later air on ABC, ABC1, and ABC3. In the United States, it briefly aired on Nickelodeon, from 9 November 2003 to 4 September 2004. It was later run on the Nicktoons channel starting from 22 May 2004 until 23 September 2007. The show also aired on Nickelodeon in Latin America and Europe.

Episodes
The episode list is listed by production code, not by airdate.

Awards
The show was nominated for a Leo Award for "Best Musical Score" in 2004.

References

External links
 

Television series about cattle
Fictional comedians
2000s Canadian animated television series
2003 Canadian television series debuts
2004 Canadian television series endings
2000s Australian animated television series
2003 Australian television series endings
2002 Australian television series debuts
Australian children's animated comedy television series
Australian children's animated fantasy television series
Canadian children's animated comedy television series
Canadian children's animated fantasy television series
Nickelodeon (Australia and New Zealand) original programming
Television series by Corus Entertainment
Television series by DHX Media
Television shows filmed in Vancouver
Teletoon original programming
Yaks
English-language television shows
Canadian flash animated television series
Australian flash animated television series
Animated television series about children